Pucca Chocolate is a Japanese baked pretzel candy with a chocolate cream center. It is also available in strawberry and milk flavors. It is created by the Meiji Seika Kaisha Corporation and has several distributors in the United States, though it is still in very limited supply and is considered a niche product. It can primarily be found in Asian market grocery or snack stores. Pucca is also occasionally found at stores or conventions that cater to audiences interested in anime. It has no relation to the popular animated series Pucca.

External links 
Official Pucca Website
US Distributor

Japanese snack food